The 1991–92 NSL Cup was the 16th season of the NSL Cup, which was the main national association football knockout cup competition in Australia. Fourteen teams from around Australia entered the competition.

Bracket

Round of 16

Quarter-finals

Semi-finals

Final

References

NSL Cup
1991 in Australian soccer
1992 in Australian soccer